Iosif Romualdovich Grigulevich (May 5, 1913 – June 2, 1988) was a Soviet secret police (NKVD) operative active between 1937 and 1953, when he played a role in assassination plots against Communist and Bolshevik individuals who were not loyal to Joseph Stalin. This included the murders of claimed and actual Trotskyists during the Spanish Civil War including Andreu Nin Pérez, and an initial, failed assassination attempt against Leon Trotsky in Mexico.

Under the false identity of Teodoro B. Castro, a wealthy Costa Rican expatriate living in Rome, Grigulevich served as the ambassador of Costa Rica to both Italy and Yugoslavia (1952–1954). His mission was to assassinate Yugoslav leader Josip Broz Tito but the mission was aborted following Stalin's death in 1953. Grigulevich then settled in Moscow, where he worked as an expert on the history of Latin America and on the Roman Catholic Church.

He was a member of the Soviet Academy of Sciences, served as editor-in-chief of the magazine Obshchestvennye nauki i sovremennost ("Social Sciences Today"), and published many books and articles about Latin American subjects.

Early life
Grigulevich was born in Vilnius, Russian Empire (present day Lithuania), to a family of Crimean Karaites. His parents emigrated to Argentina when he was young. His father did well for himself and later sent Iosif to Europe to study. However, some sources claim that only his father moved to La Clarita, Argentina and he and his mother remained in Trakai, Lithuania, where he joined the Polish Communist Party and became acquainted with Edward Gierek, not travelling to Argentina until 1934. In any case, in 1933, he studied briefly at the Sorbonne. He was recruited by the NKVD and showed a gift for languages, soon picking up English, Spanish, French and Russian.

Secret agent
In the late 1930s, Grigulevich was sent to Spain to monitor the activities of the Workers' Party of Marxist Unification (POUM, the militia with which George Orwell served), during the course of the civil war in that country. Grigulevich worked under NKVD general Alexander Orlov, using the code names MAKS and FELIPE, and organized so-called "mobile groups" that killed, among other actual and suspected Trotskyists, POUM leader Andrés Nin. In this mission Grigulevich apparently collaborated with the assassin Vittorio Vidali, known in Spain as "Comandante Carlos Contreras."

Grigulevich was summoned back to Moscow in 1938. In January 1940 he was sent to Mexico, under the code name "Yuzek," to take part in the first attempt on the life of Leon Trotsky, again with Agent Vidali. In the wee hours of May 24, 1940, a group of Stalinist agents, led by Grigulevich and David Siqueiros, stormed Trotsky's compound at Coyoacan near Mexico City. They missed Trotsky and his wife altogether and managed only to wound their young grandson in the foot. However, during the operation, Robert Sheldon Harte, Trotsky's bodyguard, was captured and killed.  The defector Walter Krivitsky managed to hear of this attempt and sent a warning to Trotsky through Dies Committee member J.B. Matthews. Trotsky acknowledged the warning. In a letter, he responded, "Krivitsky is right. We are the two men the OGPU is sworn to kill." 

After the failed attempt to assassinate Trotsky, Grigulevich and two of his accomplices (Laura Araujo Aguilar and Antonio Pujol Jimenez) were helped by Pablo Neruda to escape from the Mexican police.

After Ramón Mercader killed Trotsky, Grigulevich was awarded with the Order of the Red Star.

Later, Grigulevich was sent to Argentina under the code name "Artur", where he remained during World War II and organized anti-Nazi sabotage operations. He married a Mexican woman named Laura Araujo Aguilar, who was also a Soviet secret agent, operating under the code name LUIZA.

During the late 1940s, Grigulevich's cosmopolitan Lithuanian Karaite Argentine background made him a potential target by Stalinist authorities during the campaign against "rootless cosmopolitans", and according to his later statements during Perestroika, he was in constant fear during this time. In 1948, Grigulevich's Mexican-born wife was taken hostage by Soviet bosses. While his wife was imprisoned, Soviet intelligence officials ordered several loyalty tests from Grigulevich, who was sent to operate a dead drop for another Soviet spy, Rudolf Abel, in New York City. Following this, Grigulevich was ordered to smear the reputation of the orthodox Marxist historian Lev Zubok. After completing these tasks, Grigulevich was provided with a new espionage post in Italy.

Costa Rican diplomat

In 1949, with the help of Joaquín Gutiérrez, a Costa Rican writer who harboured very pro-Soviet and Communist sympathies and who worked in his country's diplomatic corps, Grigulevich procured a false passport identifying him as Teodoro Castro Bonnefil, and settled in Rome. Grigulevich pretended to be the illegitimate son of a wealthy Costa Rican coffee producer and styled himself Teodoro B. Castro (using a middle initial in the "American manner"). He successfully established an import-export business in Rome and made extensive personal contacts with business figures and prelates of the Catholic church. He also became a friend and business partner of former Costa Rican president José Figueres and in 1951 "Teodoro B. Castro" was appointed as chargé d'affaires of the Costa Rican embassy in Rome, serving also as advisor to the Costa Rican delegation to the sixth session of the General Assembly of the United Nations, in Paris. In 1952, he was appointed as ambassador to both Italy and Yugoslavia. In the meantime, Grigulevich was secretly granted Soviet citizenship and membership in the Communist Party of the Soviet Union.

In early 1952, the Soviet intelligence services assigned Grigulevich the task of conducting the assassination of Yugoslav leader Josip Broz Tito, who had broken with Stalin in 1948 over his insistence in maintaining Yugoslav independence from Soviet control (see Tito–Stalin split). In his role as the Costa Rican ambassador (he presented his credentials on April 25, 1953), Grigulevich met with Tito on several occasions, but the death of Stalin in March 1953 interrupted the assassination plans and Grigulevich was eventually summoned back to Moscow, marking the end of his career as a Soviet secret agent. In Rome, the sudden disappearance of the Costa Rican ambassador, along with his wife and daughter, created a stir, with rumors of Mafia involvement circulating in diplomatic circles.

Historian

In Moscow, Grigulevich settled into a new life as an academic. He was awarded a doctorate in history without having to defend a thesis and worked as an expert on Latin America and the Catholic Church. He was the author of 58 books, some of which were published under the pseudonym Iosif Lavretzky (Лаврецкий). In 1976 he wrote a biography of Che Guevara. In 1979 he became a corresponding member of the Academy of Sciences of the USSR. Colleagues were puzzled by the lack of any biographical information about him prior to his forties and by his refusal to be photographed. The details of Grigulevich's role as a Soviet agent were clarified only after the fall of the communist regime, particularly with the release of the so-called "Mitrokhin archive" in the mid-1990s.

References

External links
 http://www.vestnik.com/issues/2001/1204/win/cherniavsky.htm (in Russian)
 https://web.archive.org/web/20050421162606/http://www.agentura.ru/culture007/art/lit/grig/kolpak/ (in Russian)
 https://web.archive.org/web/20090926041518/http://svr.gov.ru/history/grigulevich.html (a photo of Grigulevich in old age and a biography in Russian)
 Gravestone

1913 births
1988 deaths
People from Vilensky Uyezd
Ambassadors of Costa Rica to Italy
Ambassadors of Costa Rica to Yugoslavia
Argentina in World War II
Argentine emigrants to the Soviet Union
Argentine spies
Communist Party of the Soviet Union members
Crimean Karaites
Recipients of the Order of Friendship of Peoples
Recipients of the Order of the Red Banner
Recipients of the Order of the Red Banner of Labour
Recipients of the Order of the Red Star
Diplomats from Vilnius
People of the KGB
NKVD officers
Perpetrators of political repression in the Second Spanish Republic
Soviet people of the Spanish Civil War
Soviet Union–Yugoslavia relations
Corresponding Members of the USSR Academy of Sciences
Writers from Vilnius
Soviet historians